is the 35th single by the Japanese idol girl group AKB48. It was released in Japan on February 26, 2014, by King Records. This single was first performed at AKB48's "AKB48 Request Hour Setlist Best 200 2014" concert. This is Yuko Oshima's last senbatsu participation in AKB48. The single reached number one on Oricon and Billboard's weekly charts, and placed third overall in Oricon's year-end chart with 1,153,906 copies.

Promotion and release 
"Mae shika Mukanee", was first revealed to the public on January 24, 2014 at AKB48's "AKB48 Request Hour Setlist Best 200 2014 (Part 1)" concert at the Tokyo Dome City Hall. The title track's center performer is Yuko Oshima, and it is also her final senbatsu participation with AKB48. This also served as Ayaka Kikuchi (singer) and Misato Nonaka’s final single with the group.  The members who participated in this song have participated in the group's previous song "Heart Electric". New participants include Mako Kojima and Akari Suda, and it is Kojima's first participation on an AKB48 title track. and Suda's first Senbatsu participation since Koisuru Fortune Cookie a year ago. 

The lyrics were written by Yasushi Akimoto.

The single was released in four types; Type A (Normal / Limited Edition), Type B (Normal / Limited Edition), Type C (Normal / Limited Edition), and Theater Edition. The supporting tracks on the single are done by various subgroups: "Smiling Lions", "Beauty Giraffes", "Baby Elephants", and "Talking Chimpanzees".

The full version of the music video lasts more than 20 minutes, and it wasn't released on YouTube; instead, an edited version of MV only with the performance of the entire song has been published.

This song is performed in the last episode of variety show AKBingo! on September 24, 2019.

Track list

Type A

Type B

Type C

Theater edition

Personnel

"Mae Shika Mukanee" All Stars

source:
Center : Yuko Oshima
 AKB48 Team A: Rina Kawaei, Minami Takahashi, Yui Yokoyama, Mayu Watanabe
 AKB48 Team K: Yuko Oshima
 AKB48 Team B: Yuki Kashiwagi, Haruna Kojima, Haruka Shimazaki
 AKB48 Team 4: Mako Kojima, Minami Minegishi
 SKE48 Team S / AKB48 Team K: Jurina Matsui
 SKE48 Team KII: Akari Suda
 SKE48 Team E: Rena Matsui
 NMB48 Team N: Sayaka Yamamoto
 NMB48 Team N / AKB48 Team B: Miyuki Watanabe
 HKT48 Team H: Rino Sashihara

"Kinou Yori Motto Suki" Smiling Lions
source:
 AKB48 Team A: Anna Iriyama
 AKB48 Team B: Rena Kato
 AKB48 Team 4: Nana Okada, Miki Nishino
 AKB48 Kenkyuusei: Nana Owada (Center)
 SKE48 Team S: Yuria Kizaki
 SKE48 Team E: Kanon Kimoto
 SKE48 Kenkyuusei: Ryoha Kitagawa
 NMB48 Team N: Miru Shiroma
 NMB48 Team M / AKB48 Team A: Fuuko Yagura
 NMB48 Team BII: Shu Yabushita
 NMB48 Kenkyuusei: Nagisa Shibuya
 HKT48 Team H: Sakura Miyawaki
 HKT48 Team H / AKB48 Team A: Haruka Kodama
 HKT48 Kenkyuusei: Meru Tashima, Mio Tomonaga

“Kimi no Uso wo Shitteita” Beauty Giraffes
Team A: Ayaka Kikuchi, Sumire Sato

Team K: Maria Abe, Rie Kitahara, Asuka Kuramochi, Shihori Suzuki, Nana Fujita, Tomu Muto, Ami Maeda, Mariya Nagao (Center)

Team B: Reina Fujie

Team 4: Mitsuki Maeda, Shinobu Mogi

SKE48 Team E / AKB48 Team K: Nao Furuhata

NMB48 Team N: Kei Jonishi, Akari Yoshida

HKT48 Team H: Natsumi Matsuoka, Madoka Moriyasu

JKT48 Team J / AKB48 Team B: Aki Takajo

"Himitsu no Diary"  Baby Elephants
source:
 AKB48 Team A: Ryoka Oshima, Marina Kobayashi, Yukari Sasaki, Juri Takahashi (center), Yūka Tano
 AKB48 Team B: Miyuu Omori, Miyu Takeuchi
 AKB48 Team B / NMB48 Team N: Miori Ichikawa
 AKB48 Team 4: Moe Aigasa, Ayana Shinozaki, Yuiri Murayama
 AKB48 Kenkyuusei: Mion Mukaichi
 SKE48 Team KII: Mizuho Yamada
 SKE48 Team E: Rion Azuma
 NMB48 Team N: Rina Kondo
 NMB48 Team BII: Yuuri Ota
 HKT48 Team H: Chihiro Anai, Aika Ota, Aoi Motomura
 HKT48 Kenkyuusei: Yuka Akiyoshi, Nako Yabuki

“KONJO” Talking Chimpanzees
Team A: Karen Iwata
Team K: Haruka Shimada
Team B: Ayaka Umeda, Suzuran Yamauchi, Misaki Iwasa, Mina Oba, Mariko Nakamura (Center), Shizuka Oya
Team 4: Saho Iwatate, Yurina Takashima,
SKE48 Team KII: Aya Shibata, Akane Takayanagi, Airi Furukawa
SKE48 Kenkyuusei: Kaori Matsumura
NMB48 Team N: Mayu Ogasawara, Riho Miaki
NMB48 Team M: Nana Yamada
HKT48 Team H: Chiyori Nakanishi, Anna Murashige
HKT48 Kenkyuusei: Marika Tani

"Koi to ka..."
(28 Members)

Team A: Rina Izuta, Matsui Sakiko, Ayaka Morikawa
Team K: Mayumi Uchida, Kana Kobayashi, Rina Chikano, Chisato Nakata, Miyazaki Miho
Team B: Haruka Ishida, Haruka Katayama, Natsuki Kojima, Miku Tanabe, Wakana Natori, Misato Nonaka
Team 4: Natsuki Uchiyama, Ayano Umeta, Ayaka Okada, Saki Kitazawa, Hashimoto Hikari
Kenkyuusei: Ichikawa Manami, Okawa Rio, Haruka Komiyama, Kiara Sato, Tatsuya Makiho, Mizuki Tsuchiyasu, Seina Fukuoka, Ami Yumoto
SNH48 Team SII / AKB48 Team A: Mariya Suzuki

Charts

JKT48 version

An Indonesian version of the song, "Mae Shika Mukanee -Hanya Lihat Ke Depan-", was released on June 1, 2016 by AKB48's sister group JKT48.

Release 
The single has two versions: Regular Edition (CD+DVD) and Music Download Card. First Senbatsu of Dwi Putri Bonita, Dena Siti Rohyati and Shania Senbatsu and Undergirls decided from JKT48 13th Single Senbatsu Sousenkyo Ravenska Mamesah's last single.

Track listing

Regular Edition

Music Card

JKT48 Personnel

Mae Shika Mukanee 
Center: Jessica Veranda
 Team J: Dena Siti Rohyati, Gabriela Margareth Warouw, Ghaida Farisya, Jessica Veranda, Melody Nurramdhani Laksani, Nabilah Ratna Ayu Azalia, Shania Junianatha, Thalia Ivanka Elizabeth
 Team KIII: Chikano Rina, Cindy Yuvia, Devi Kinal Putri, Dwi Putri Bonita, Priscillia Sari Dewi
 Team T: Michelle Christo Kusnadi, Nakagawa Haruka, Shania Gracia

Dakishimechaikenai 
Center: Sinka Juliani
 Team J: Ayana Shahab, Beby Chaesara Anadila, Jessica Vania, Shinta Naomi, Sendy Ariani
 Team KIII: Della Delila, Nadila Cindi Wantari, Natalia, Ratu Vienny Fitrilya, Riskha Fairunissa, Saktia Oktapyani, Sinka Juliani, Viviyona Apriani
 Team T: Nadhifa Salsabila, Ni Made Ayu Vania Aurellia, Shani Indira Natio

Kataomoi Finally 
Center: Melody Nurramdhani Laksani
 Team J: Ayana Shahab, Beby Chaesara Anadila, Dena Siti Rohyati, Frieska Anastasia Laksani, Gabriela Margareth Warouw, Ghaida Farisya, Jennifer Rachel Natasya, Jessica Vania, Jessica Veranda, Melody Nurramdhani Laksani, Nabilah Ratna Ayu Azalia, Rezky Wiranti Dhike, Sendy Ariani, Shania Junianatha, Shinta Naomi, Sonia Natalia, Thalia Ivanka Elizabeth

Migi e Magare! 
Center: Cindy Yuvia
 Team KIII: Alicia Chanzia, Cindy Yuvia, Della Delila, Devi Kinal Putri, Dwi Putri Bonita, Fakhriyani Shafariyanti, Jennifer Hanna, Lidya Maulida Djuhandar, Nadila Cindi Wantari, Natalia, Priscillia Sari Dewi, Ratu Vienny Fitrilya, Chikano Rina, Riskha Fairunissa, Rona Anggreani, Saktia Oktapyani, Sinka Juliani, Viviyona Apriani

Hashire! Penguin 
Center: Michelle Christo Kusnadi
 Team T: Amanda Dwi Arista, Aninditha Rahma Cahyadi, Ayu Safira Oktaviani, Chikita Ravenska Mamesah, Feni Fitriyanti, Fransisca Saraswati Puspa Dewi, Nakagawa Haruka, Maria Genoveva Natalia Desy Purnamasari Gunawan, Michelle Christo Kusnadi, Nadhifa Salsabila, Ni Made Ayu Vania Aurellia, Shani Indira Natio, Shania Gracia, Stephanie Pricilla Indarto Putri, Syahfira Angela Nurhaliza, Yansen Indiani

References 

2014 singles
AKB48 songs
Songs with lyrics by Yasushi Akimoto
King Records (Japan) singles
2014 songs
Oricon Weekly number-one singles